Athboy is an unincorporated community in Corson County, in the U.S. state of South Dakota.

History
A post office was established at Athboy in 1916, and remained in operation until 1944. The community was named by postal officials.

References

Unincorporated communities in Corson County, South Dakota
Unincorporated communities in South Dakota